Olya Tayeb Rural District is a rural district (dehestan) in the Central District of Landeh County, Kohgiluyeh and Boyer-Ahmad Province, Iran. At the 2006 census, its population was 3,253, in 596 families. The rural district has 40 villages.

References 

Rural Districts of Kohgiluyeh and Boyer-Ahmad Province
Landeh County